{{Speciesbox
| image = Gryllidae - Gryllomorpha dalmatina.JPG
| image_caption = Gryllomorpha dalmatina. Male
| genus = Gryllomorpha
| species = dalmatina
| authority = (Ocskay, 1832)
| display_parents = 3
| synonyms = * Acheta dalmatina  Ocskay, 1832
 Gryllomorpha fasciata  Fieber, 1853
 Gryllomorpha pieperi'   Harz, 1979
 Gryllomorpha strumae  Andreeva, 1982
 Gryllus aptera  Schaffer, 1838 
}}Gryllomorpha dalmatina, common name wingless house-cricket, is a species of cricket belonging to the family Gryllidae subfamily Gryllomorphinae. 

Subspecies
Subspecies include:
 Gryllomorpha dalmatina cretensis (Ramme, 1927)
 Gryllomorpha dalmatina dalmatina (Ocskay, 1832)
 Gryllomorpha dalmatina minutissima (Gorochov & Ünal, 2012)
 Gryllomorpha dalmatina pieperi (Harz, 1979)
 Gryllomorpha dalmatina schmidti (Gorochov, 1996)

Distribution
This cricket is mainly present in France, Italy, Slovenia, Spain, Switzerland, in the Near East and in North Africa.

DescriptionGryllomorpha dalmatina is the largest species of the genus Gryllomorpha''. They are wingless. The basic coloration of the body is pale brown, with dark-brown markings on the body and the legs. The antennae are very long. Also legs are rather long.

Biology
They can commonly be encountered in nature from April through early Autumn, but in the domestic environment they are active all year round. They can be found in buildings, especially in dark moist places, as caves, cellars, basements, but also under stones and bark.  As a matter of fact, these crickets fear the light and feed on organic debris.

References

Crickets
Insects described in 1832
Taxa named by Franz Ocskay
Orthoptera of Europe